Fast Last! is an album by trumpeter Lester Bowie recorded for the Muse label and released in 1974. It features performances by Bowie, Julius Hemphill, John Hicks, John Stubblefield, Joseph Bowie, Bob Stewart, Cecil McBee, Jerome Cooper, Charles Shaw and Phillip Wilson.

Reception
The Allmusic review by Scott Yanow awarded the album 4 stars, stating, "As is often true of a Lester Bowie record, this set has surprising moments and a liberal use of absurd humor, along with some fine playing... A fine introduction to Lester Bowie's diverse music".  
 The duo recording of "Hello Dolly" with Hicks "recalls [Louis] Armstrong's acclaimed version of 'Dear Old Southland' with Buck Washington on piano (Apr. 5, 1930) and thus illustrates Bowie's interest in connecting his avant-garde trumpeting with Armstrong's lyrical tone."

Track listing
 "Lonely Woman" (Coleman) -  5:15  
 "Banana Whistle" - 9:48  
 "Hello Dolly" (Herman) - 5:00  
 "Fast Last/C" - 12:55  
 "F Troop Rides Again" - 9:38  
All compositions by Lester Bowie except as indicated 
Recorded September 1974 at C.I. Recording Studios

Personnel
Lester Bowie – trumpet (all tracks) and flugelhorn (track 4)
Julius Hemphill – alto saxophone (tracks 1, 2 & 4), arrangements (track 1)
John Hicks – piano (tracks 1, 2, 3 & 4)
John Stubblefield – tenor saxophone (tracks 1 & 2)
Joseph Bowie – trombone (tracks 1 & 2) 
Bob Stewart – tuba (tracks 1 & 2)
Cecil McBee – bass (tracks 1, 2 & 4)
Phillip Wilson – drums (tracks 1, 2, 4 & 5)
Jerome Cooper – drums (track 5)
Charles Shaw – drums (track 5)

References

1974 albums
Muse Records albums
Lester Bowie albums
Albums produced by Michael Cuscuna